Edgar Humberto Ruiz Sierra (born January 22, 1971 in Bogotá) is a retired male road cyclist from Colombia, who was a professional from 1994 to 1995.

Career

1990
1st in General Classification Vuelta a Colombia Sub-23 (COL)
1992
6th in General Classification Vuelta a Colombia (COL)
1993
2nd in General Classification Vuelta a Colombia (COL)

References
 

1971 births
Living people
Colombian male cyclists
Sportspeople from Bogotá